In complex analysis of one and several complex variables, Wirtinger derivatives (sometimes also called Wirtinger operators), named after Wilhelm Wirtinger who introduced them in 1927 in the course of his studies on the theory of functions of several complex variables, are partial differential operators of the first order which behave in a very similar manner to the ordinary derivatives with respect to one real variable, when applied to holomorphic functions, antiholomorphic functions or simply differentiable functions on complex domains. These operators permit the construction of a differential calculus for such functions that is entirely analogous to the ordinary differential calculus for functions of real variables.

Historical notes

Early days (1899–1911): the work of Henri Poincaré

The work of Dimitrie Pompeiu in 1912 and 1913: a new formulation

where  is the boundary of a disk of radius  entirely contained in the domain of definition of  i.e. his bounding circle. In his following paper,  uses this newly defined concept in order to introduce his generalization of Cauchy's integral formula, the now called Cauchy–Pompeiu formula.

The work of Wilhelm Wirtinger

The first systematic introduction of Wirtinger derivatives seems due to Wilhelm Wirtinger in the paper  in order to simplify the calculations of quantities occurring in the theory of functions of several complex variables: as a result of the introduction of these differential operators, the form of all the differential operators commonly used in the theory, like the Levi operator and the Cauchy–Riemann operator, is considerably simplified and consequently easier to handle. The paper is deliberately written from a formal point of view, i.e. without giving a rigorous derivation of the properties deduced.

Formal definition

Functions of one complex variable
 Consider the complex plane  The Wirtinger derivatives are defined as the following linear partial differential operators of first order:

Clearly, the natural domain of definition of these partial differential operators is the space of  functions on a domain  but, since these operators are linear and have constant coefficients, they can be readily extended to every space of generalized functions.

Functions of n > 1 complex variables
 Consider the Euclidean space on the complex field  The Wirtinger derivatives are defined as the following linear partial differential operators of first order:

As for Wirtinger derivatives for functions of one complex variable, the natural domain of definition of these partial differential operators is again the space of  functions on a domain  and again, since these operators are linear and have constant coefficients, they can be readily extended to every space of generalized functions.

Basic properties

Linearity

Product rule
 If  then for  the product rule holds

This property implies that Wirtinger derivatives are derivations from the abstract algebra point of view, exactly like ordinary derivatives are.

Chain rule

Functions of one complex variable
 If  and  then the chain rule holds

Functions of n > 1 complex variables
 If  and  then for  the following form of the chain rule holds

Conjugation
 If  then for  the following equalities hold

See also
CR–function
Dolbeault complex
Dolbeault operator
Pluriharmonic function

Notes

References

Historical references
. "On a boundary value problem" (free translation of the title) is the first paper where a set of (fairly complicate) necessary and sufficient conditions for the solvability of the Dirichlet problem for holomorphic functions of several variables is given.
.
. "Areolar derivative and functions of bounded variation" (free English translation of the title) is an important reference paper in the theory of areolar derivatives. 
. "Studies on essential singular points of analytic functions of two or more complex variables" (English translation of the title) is an important paper in the theory of functions of several complex variables, where the problem of determining what kind of hypersurface can be the boundary of a domain of holomorphy.
.
. "On the functions of two or more complex variables" (free English translation of the title) is the first paper where a sufficient condition for the solvability of the Cauchy problem for holomorphic functions of several complex variables is given.
.
, available at DigiZeitschriften.
.
.
.

, available at DigiZeitschriften. In this important paper, Wirtinger introduces several important concepts in the theory of functions of several complex variables, namely Wirtinger's derivatives and the tangential Cauchy-Riemann condition.

Scientific references
. Introduction to complex analysis is a short course in the theory of functions of several complex variables, held in February 1972 at the Centro Linceo Interdisciplinare di Scienze Matematiche e Loro Applicazioni "Beniamino Segre".
.
.
.
.
.
.
.
. "Elementary introduction to the theory of functions of complex variables with particular regard to integral representations" (English translation of the title) are the notes form a course, published by the Accademia Nazionale dei Lincei, held by Martinelli when he was "Professore Linceo".
 . A textbook on complex analysis including many historical notes on the subject.
. Notes from a course held by Francesco Severi at the Istituto Nazionale di Alta Matematica (which at present bears his name), containing appendices of Enzo Martinelli, Giovanni Battista Rizza and Mario Benedicty. An English translation of the title reads as:-"Lectures on analytic functions of several complex variables – Lectured in 1956–57 at the Istituto Nazionale di Alta Matematica in Rome".

Complex analysis
Differential operators
Mathematical analysis